The Apostolic Nunciature to Zambia is an ecclesiastical office of the Catholic Church in Zambia. It is a diplomatic post of the Holy See, whose representative is called the Apostolic Nuncio with the rank of an ambassador.

List of papal representatives
Apostolic Pro-Nuncios
Alfredo Poledrini (27 October 1965 - 20 September 1971)
Luciano Angeloni (24 December 1970 - 25 November 1978)
Giorgio Zur (5 February 1979 - 3 May 1985)
Eugenio Sbarbaro (14 September 1985 - 7 February 1991)
Apostolic Nuncios
Giuseppe Leanza (4 June 1991 - 29 April 1999)
Orlando Antonini (24 July 1999 - 16 November 2005)
Nicola Girasoli (24 January 2006 - 29 October 2011)
Julio Murat (27 January 2012 - 24 March 2018)
Gianfranco Gallone (2 February 2019 – 3 January 2023)

References

 

 
Holy See
Zambia